Tommaso Guzzoni, C.O. (28 September 1632 – 8 November 1704) was a Roman Catholic prelate who served as Bishop of Sora (1681–1702).

Biography
Tommaso Guzzoni was born in Benevento, Italy on 28 September 1632. On 13 May 1653, he professed as a member of the Congregation of the Oratory of Saint Philip Neri and was ordained a deacon on 19 December 1654 and ordained a priest on 18 September 1655. On 13 January 1681, he was appointed during the papacy of Pope Innocent XI as Bishop of Sora. On 26 January 1681, he was consecrated bishop by Alessandro Crescenzi (cardinal), Bishop of Recanati e Loreto, with Pier Antonio Capobianco, Bishop Emeritus of Lacedonia, and Antonio Savo de' Panicoli, Bishop of Termoli, serving as co-consecrators. He served as Bishop of Sora until his resignation on 5 December 1702.  He died on 8 November 1704.

Episcopal succession
While bishop, he was the principal co-consecrator of:

References

External links and additional sources
 (for Chronology of Bishops) 
 (for Chronology of Bishops) 

17th-century Italian Roman Catholic bishops
Bishops appointed by Pope Innocent XI
1632 births
1704 deaths